RBCL may refer to:
 RbCl or Rubidium chloride, an alkali metal halide
 rbcL or RuBisCO large subunit, a plant gene